San-Giuliano (French form) or San Giuliano di Campoloro (or), is a French commune in the Haute-Corse department, island of Corsica.

It is the easternmost town of the island.

Population

See also
Communes of the Haute-Corse department
Tour de Fiorentina

References

Communes of Haute-Corse